Henry Charles Howard, 13th Duke of Norfolk,  (12 August 179118 February 1856), styled Earl of Surrey between 1815 and 1842, was a British Whig politician and peer.

Background
Norfolk was the son of Bernard Edward Howard, 12th Duke of Norfolk, and Lady Elizabeth, daughter of Henry Belasyse, 2nd Earl Fauconberg. He gained the courtesy title Earl of Surrey when his father succeeded as Duke of Norfolk in 1815.

Political career
On 4 May 1829 Norfolk, then Earl of Surrey, was elected to the House of Commons for Horsham. When he took his seat he became the first Roman Catholic to sit in the House after Catholic emancipation. Surrey held the Horsham seat until 1832, and then represented West Sussex between 1832 and 1841. He was sworn of the Privy Council in 1837 and served under Lord Melbourne as Treasurer of the Household between 1837 and 1841. In the latter year he was summoned to the House of Lords through a writ of acceleration in his father's junior title of Baron Maltravers, and served briefly under Melbourne as Captain of the Yeomen of the Guard between July and August 1841. The following year he succeeded his father in the dukedom of Norfolk.

When the Whigs returned to office under Lord John Russell in 1846, Norfolk was made Master of the Horse, a position he retained until the government fell in 1852. He later served as Lord Steward of the Household in Lord Aberdeen's coalition government between 1853 and 1854. He was invested as a Knight of the Garter in 1848.

In 1854, Norfolk agreed to lease land to Sheffield Cricket Club near Bramall Lane for ninety-nine years, a site which is now home to Sheffield United.

Family
Norfolk married Lady Charlotte Sophia Leveson-Gower, daughter of George Leveson-Gower, 1st Duke of Sutherland, in 1814. They had five children:

Henry Granville Fitzalan-Howard, 14th Duke of Norfolk (1815–1860).
Edward George Fitzalan-Howard, 1st Baron Howard of Glossop (1818–1883).
Lady Mary Charlotte Howard (1822–1897), married Thomas Foley, 4th Baron Foley.
Lord Bernard Thomas Fitzalan-Howard (1825–1846).
Lady Adeliza Matilda Fitzalan-Howard (1829–1904), married in 1855 her second cousin, Lord George Manners.

Norfolk died in February 1856, aged 64, and was succeeded in the dukedom by his eldest son, Henry. The Duchess of Norfolk died in July 1870.

References

External links 
 
 
 

Surrey, Henry Howard, Earl of
Earls Marshal
1791 births
1856 deaths
313
31
306
Earls of Norfolk (1644 creation)
21
Henry
Knights of the Garter
Members of the Privy Council of the United Kingdom
Howard, Henry
Surrey, Henry Howard, Earl of
Surrey, Henry Howard, Earl of
Surrey, Henry Howard, Earl of
Surrey, Henry Howard, Earl of
Surrey, Henry Howard, Earl of
Howard, Henry
Norfolk, D13
Treasurers of the Household
Howard, Henry